What About Mimi? is a Canadian animated television series. The show was produced by Decode Entertainment and Studio B Productions (then DHX Media, now WildBrain). The show first premiered on Teletoon on October 4, 2000 with the final episode's airing on August 14, 2002, leading up to 3 seasons and 39 episodes overall.

Plot
The show that focuses on Mimi Mortin, a clever, redheaded girl in the sixth grade who lives in the Canadian town of Starfish Bay with two friends, Elaine and Russell and her family, but rivaled with Sincerity.

Characters
 Miriam "Mimi" Mortin (voiced by Chiara Zanni) - a redheaded 11-year-old girl in the sixth grade. She is clever, optimistic and has a powerful imagination. She is always willing to help and solve any problem that she may encounter, most of the times with creative plans and ideas. Although her plans may not always work out the way she expects them, Mimi receives a lot of help from her best friends Elaine and Russell, her family, and even her rivals, and finds a way to solve any problem.
 Elaine Pituskin (voiced by Kori Cook) - Mimi's best friend. An Asian-Canadian girl, who is an animal and nature lover, owning many pets. She can be temperamental and argue with Mimi at times, but she always looks up to Mimi as her best friend, in turn, Mimi respects her a lot.
 Russell Van Eden (voiced by Rhys Huber) - Mimi's other best friend and sidekick. A boy with blonde hair and blue eyes, who is a sports lover, although he is a bit clumsy. He has skills with his video camera and aspires to be a movie director. He is shown to have a crush on Sincerity early in the series but his interest on her fades away by the end, instead hinting at being attracted to Mimi.
 Sincerity Travers (voiced by Carly McKillip) - a snobbish preppy girl with pink hair who, sometimes, does not get along with Mimi. She and Mimi used to be friends in kindergarten, but as they got older, their interests diverged, and they began growing apart. She is Mimi's rival in school, and although she does not get along with her, she admits that her ideas are very good and helps with some of her schemes. Even if she does not get along with Mimi, she has a resentful respect for her, showing that deep inside, Sincerity still considers her a true friend.
 Brock Wickersham (voiced by Tony Sampson) - a bully who enjoys pulling pranks on all characters, especially on Herbert Finkle.
 Budrick "Buddy" Wickersham (voiced by Andrew Francis) - Brock's younger brother who is also a bully. It is also revealed that he is a genius, but he does not want people to find out about it, especially his big brother, explaining that the fact would embarrass him in front of his family.
 Bradley "Brad" Mortin (voiced by Keith Miller) - Mimi's 9-year-old brother who knows that Mimi's plans always have flaws.
 Jason Mortin (voiced by Sam Vincent) - Mimi's older brother who thinks of himself as an on-the-edge rebel.
 Saffron Mortin (voiced by Ellen Kennedy) - Mimi's vegan mother who always feeds her children vegetables.
 Marvin "Marv" Mortin (voiced by Colin Murdock) - Mimi's father.
 Hayley Kinaschuk (voiced by Ellen Kennedy) - Sincerity's best friend and "lackey", although she is kind and many times disagrees with Sincerity, and is good friends with Mimi, Elaine and Russell. She is of Russian descent.
 Herbert Finkle (voiced by Peter Kelamis) - a nerd at Mimi's school. He is in charge of the school newspaper. He's also often the target of Brock and Buddy's pranks.
 Lodeman (voiced by Peter Kelamis) - a student at Mimi's school who tends to make very bad noises and to act distracted all the time.
 Ms. Victoria Frances Grindstone (voiced by Saffron Henderson) - Mimi's teacher.
 Mr. Petri (voiced by Sam Vincent) - a science teacher who blames Brock for everything bad (even over things Brock never did) because of his state of being a bully and for pulling several pranks inside of his classroom.
 Mr. Jacques (voiced by Dale Wilson) - a gym teacher.
 Ms. Murchison - the librarian of Starfish Bay School. She and Mr. Pianoforte hate each other.
 Principal Earl (voiced by Garry Chalk) - the principal of Starfish Bay School.
 Mr. Pianoforte - a music teacher. He and Ms. Murchison hate each other.

Episodes
The series consists of 39 half-hour episodes divided into three seasons. The first two seasons consist of 13 episodes with a full 22-minute story each, while the third season consists of 13 episodes divided into 26 11-minute stories.

Series overview

Season 1 (2000–01)

Season 2 (2001)

Season 3 (2002)

Awards
The show won a Pulcinella Award for the Best Series for Children in 2001.

Telecast and home media
What About Mimi? was first premiered on Teletoon in 2000 until 2002 with repeats until the late 2000s. The show does not air in the U.S., but PorchLight's KidMango had episodes online. Internationally, the show does air on Fox Kids (now Disney XD) in Latin America and KiKa in Germany. As of 2022, the show had added with m4e's YouTube channel online.

Two volumes of the show have been released on DVD in Canada by Anchor Bay Entertainment. Volume 1 includes four half-hour episodes and one 11-minute episode. Volume 2 includes three half-hour episodes and three 11-minute episodes. The first two episodes were additionally released on DVD in Australia as part of a compilation series.

 What About Mimi? Volume 1: Lights, Camera, Action; Outta Sync; The Play's The Thing; A Star Isn't Born; Critics Choice
 What About Mimi? Volume 2: Wildthing; High Toon; Skiing is Believing; Iron Guy; Club Mimi; Sports Day
 The Best of What About Mimi?: Second Honeymoon; The Great Campaign

References

2000 Canadian television series debuts
Canadian children's animated comedy television series
Television shows set in British Columbia
Television shows filmed in Vancouver
Television series by DHX Media
Teletoon original programming
2002 Canadian television series endings
2000s Canadian animated television series
Animated television series about children
English-language television shows